David Llewellyn may refer to:

David Llewellyn (Australian politician) (born 1942), member of the Parliament of Tasmania
David Llewellyn (British politician) (1916–1992), British Member of Parliament for Cardiff North, 1950–1959
David Llewellyn (author) (born 1978), Welsh novelist
David Llewellyn (golfer) (born 1951), Welsh golfer
David Llewellyn (rugby union) (born 1970), Wales international rugby union player also known as Dai
David Llewellyn (academic) (born 1960), Vice-Chancellor of Harper Adams University
Sir David Llewellyn, 1st Baronet (1879–1940), Welsh industrialist and financier
David Llewellyn (trade unionist) (1907–?), Welsh trade unionist and political activist
Dai Llewellyn (Sir David Llewellyn, 4th Baronet, 1946–2009), socialite
David Herbert Llewellyn (died 1864), doctor who went down with the CSS Alabama
David Llewellyn (footballer), (born 1949), footballer with West Ham United and Peterborough United

See also
Dafydd ap Llewelyn (disambiguation)
David Llewellin (born 1960), Welsh rally driver